Miss Manipur or Miss Manipur Queen is an annual beauty pageant that is run by the Manipur based Miss Manipur Committee (MMC). It is one of the most watched beauty pageants in North East India. It co-exists with Femina Miss India Manipur, Miss Kangleipak and Miss Meetei Chanu.
The titleholder of Miss Manipur represents Manipur in the Miss North East, organised by Northeast Beauty Pageant Organisation (NEBPO) every year.

History 
Miss Manipur was first held in the year 1951. It is the first beauty pageant organised in Manipur. In October, 2012, the Miss Manipur event (that was about to be held on November 12, 2012) was banned by 42 civil society organizations  including 17 women bodies of Manipur. The women associations accused the event organizers for converting the contest into commercial way and also for promoting improper dressings of the participants. In 2016, the ban was lifted up by the associations as the required rules and regulations for the event was finally composed.

Eligibility Criteria 
A person is eligible to participate in the Miss Manipur contest if she is:
 of Indian origin (regardless of her birthplace)
 belongs to the age group of 16–25 years
 a resident of Manipur (documents required)

Prizes 
The top three winners of the Miss Manipur are bestowed the awards with the following cash prizes:
 Miss Manipur Queen (First place holder) : ₹1 lakh
 First Princess (Second place holder) : ₹80,000
 Second Princess (Third place holder) : ₹60,000

Titleholders

Notes

References 

Beauty pageants in Manipur
Beauty pageants in India